First Baptist Church of Boca Grande is a historic Southern Baptist church located at 421 4th Street West, Boca Grande, Florida in Lee County. It was established in 1909 on Gasparilla Island.

It was added to the National Register of Historic Places in 2009.

References

National Register of Historic Places in Lee County, Florida
Churches on the National Register of Historic Places in Florida
Baptist churches in Florida
Gasparilla Island
1909 establishments in Florida
Churches completed in 1909
Southern Baptist Convention churches